was a Japanese Rinzai Zen master, and the abbot of the Ryōmon-ji and Nyohō-ji.  He is best known for his talks on the Unborn as he called it.

Biography

Early years
Bankei Yōtaku was born in 1622, in Harima Province to a samurai turned medicine man named Suga Dosetsu. His boyhood name was Muchi. Bankei's mother bore the last name of Noguchi, and little more is known of her, other than that the society of the time extolled her as 'Maya who begot three Buddhas,' - Maya being the mother of the historical Buddha, Shakyamuni. Bankei had four brothers and four sisters. His eldest brother, Masayasu, was a skilled physician and his second eldest brother was a practitioner of the Pure Land school of Buddhism. Hence Bankei's mother was likened to Maya, Masayasu to Yakushi - the Buddha of healing, his second eldest brother to the Buddha Amida, and Bankei himself to Shakyamuni Buddha. Bankei was a rebellious and mischievous child, though he showed remarkable intelligence. When Bankei was 11, his father died, and in the following year he entered school.

Start of search
Here he was taught many of the Confucian texts. At this time, Bankei was young and full of questions and the Confucian classics he was being taught confused him greatly. One day, the teacher read the first line from 'Great Learning': "The way of great learning lies in clarifying bright virtue." Bankei entered a heated exchange with his teacher imploring them for the meaning of this. Bankei felt no satisfactory answers were given.

This gap in Bankei's understanding gave birth to many doubts and questions, and so he seized most every chance to question others on their knowledge. He would implore Confucian and Buddhist scholars and attend various religious gatherings in search of answers. All of this, however, proved futile for him. He became so distraught in his need to find answers that school was no longer a priority for him, and in 1633 he was kicked out of his family home. A family friend, Yūkan Nakahori, allowed Bankei to stay in a hut nearby. Being a bit eccentric, Bankei etched into a slat of wood "Practice hermitage" and placed it outside of his little hut.

Buddhist training
It is likely that Bankei began practicing Shin Buddhism during this time. It is known that when Bankei was 15 he trained at a Shingon temple, where he apparently gained some footing in sutra study. However, Bankei was not satisfied with the Shingon approach and left that following year. At 16 he walked from Hamada to Ako to see a Rinzai Zen priest named Umpo Zenjo at Zuiō-ji. Bankei wasted no time with Umpo and implored him on the meaning of bright virtue, to which Umpo advised the only path toward such understanding could be had through the practice of zazen. Bankei was intrigued by this advice and ordained as a monk at Zuiō-ji under Umpo. It was here he received his Buddhist name Yōtaku (meaning 'Long Polishing of the Mind Gem').

When Bankei turned 19 he left Zuiō-ji shortly after and travelled through Kyoto, Osaka and Kyūshū in search for an answer to his question. During his travels he would stay over at temples or sleep in the open wilderness, scrounging by as a beggar. In 1645, at age 24, Bankei returned to Zuiō-ji no wiser than the day he left. At this time Umpo informs him that the answer which he seeks can only be found within, not through an intermediary. Bankei left shortly after his return and built a hut nearby and lived as a hermit. He would sit for hours practicing zazen. He had given up bodily comfort and had no other goal during this time aside from coming to a complete understanding of things. He practiced this way for many years, but eventually the bodily neglect caused him to contract tuberculosis. He sought the counsel of a doctor who gave the prognosis of death.

Realizing the Unborn
It was during this near-death experience that Bankei realized the Unborn, later stating of the experience:

Following this breakthrough his doubt and questioning ceased while his physical condition ameliorated. Once strong enough, he travelled back to Umpo to relay his experience. Umpo confirmed his enlightenment, and sent him off to have his understanding further evidenced by Gudō Toshoku, another Rinzai master.

Seeking confirmation
At the age of 26 Bankei went to Gifu Prefecture to Daisen-ji where Gudo was abbot. However, when he arrived Gudo was attending to another temple of his in the countryside. So Bankei visited the temples of other Zen teachers in the area, none of which had priests with the proper understanding themselves to confirm his understanding. After a year living in the countryside near Daisen-ji, again Bankei travelled back to Umpo. In 1651, Bankei heard that a Ch'an master had arrived in Nagasaki by the name of Dosha Chogen. Umpo advised he go see the Ch'an master, and Bankei set off for Nagasaki hoping to finally have his enlightenment confirmed.

Bankei found Dosha Chogen at Sōfuku-ji, a Chinese style temple. On their first meeting, Dosha confirmed Bankei's understanding but also informed him that it was incomplete. Bankei was offended by this initially and refused to accept it. Yet he lingered at that temple to observe Dosha's ways, eventually realizing what Dosha had pronounced was true. So Bankei stayed on at Sōfuku-ji practicing under Dosha.

Final awakening
While Bankei lived among the other monks at the temple, he refused to chant the sutras with them in Chinese. In 1652, while meditating with the congregation, Bankei experienced final awakening. Dosha confirmed this the next day, stating Bankei had finally settled the Great Matter. Bankei then refused a senior position in the monastery, preferring his unassuming existence instead working in the kitchen. The following year Bankei returned to Harima for a short while, and then left for Yoshino in the Nara Prefecture to live again as a hermit. In the mountains of Yoshino, Bankei authored some Buddhist chants pertaining to the Unborn while living there in silent retreat.

Teachings

The Unborn

The Unborn (Japanese fushō) is a Sanskrit term, anutpāda:
 "An" means "not", or "non"
 "Utpāda" means "genesis", "coming forth", "birth"

Taken together "anutpāda" means "having no origin", "not coming into existence", "not taking effect", "non-production".

The Buddhist tradition uses the term "anutpāda" for the absence of an origin or sunyata. The term is also used in the Lankavatara Sutra, where it is equated with sunyata. According to D.T Suzuki, "anutpada" is not the opposite of "utpada", but transcends opposites. It is the seeing into the true nature of existence, the seeing that "all objects are without self-substance".

The full phrase is fushō fumetsu, "unborn and undying", or "no creation and no annihilation", but in later years Bankei only used the term "unborn", since Bankei thought it logically impossible to say that something which has not been created is being destroyed, rendering the term "undying" redundant. However, it is not logically impossible for something which has always existed to cease existing, hence the utility of employing both terms.

Attaining the Unborn
Although the Unborn is the natural state of man, "self-criticism" rather than zazen or koans are needed to liberate the self from illusion and dualistic thoughts and fixations (nen). According to Bankei, illusion arises through "selfish desire", and nen are "images of things seen and heard". By detaching from those illusions and fixations,

Influence
Hakuin, a near-contemporay of Bankei, strongly condemned his 'do-nothing Zen'. According to D. T. Suzuki, Bankei is one of the most important Japanese Zen masters, together with Dogen and Hakuin, and his Unborn Zen is one of the most original developments in the entire history of Zen thought.

See also
Buddhism in Japan
 Index of Buddhism-related articles
List of Rinzai Buddhists
 Secular Buddhism
Ajatavada

Notes

References

Sources

Printed sources

  
 
 
 
 
 

Web-sources

Further reading

External links
 Enlightened-Spirituality, Bankei Yōtaku. Zen Master of the "Unborn" — Fu-shō
 Dharmanet, Bankei. Excerpts from the Ashoka course "The Story of Zen"
 Colin Oliver, A View of Bankei

Zen Buddhist abbots
Japanese Buddhist clergy
Rinzai Buddhists
Beggars
1622 births
1693 deaths
Japanese Zen Buddhists
Edo period Buddhist clergy
People from Hyōgo Prefecture